"I Love London" is the second single by English electronic band Crystal Fighters from their album Star of Love. The single was released on 1 December 2009 through Zirkulo records, to mixed reviews.

Release
The track gained attention from BBC Radio 1, with plays from Nick Grimshaw and Rob da Bank. "I Love London" was featured in Mixmag's Top 100 Records of 2008, placing at number 91; this being particularly notable due to this being the only song in the list to have been unreleased at the time. The single was featured in Time Out magazine's "50 best London songs", coming in at number 49, with a justification as follows:  The release was again licensed to Kitsuné and this time included in their Maison 8 compilation album. The Delta Heavy remix of the track can be heard in the 2009 Michael Caine action-drama, Harry Brown.

Music video
Mimi Borrelli (former member of Crystal Fighters) features as the dancer in the video, which was directed by Martin Zahringer.

Track listing

Reception
The song received mixed reviews. The Guardian (2011) commented:

'I Love London, while as silly ("Willesden! Harlesden! Watford Junction!") as anything here, has charm' 

In his review of the original album release, Benjamin Hiorns of online music magazine Subba-Cultcha commented that: 

When asked in an interview by Josh Holliday, of Virgin Media, as to the disparity between the album on the whole and this particular single, Pringle had the following comment:

References

2009 singles
Crystal Fighters songs
2009 songs
Songs about London